The Athens micropolitan area may refer to:

The Athens, Ohio micropolitan area, United States
The Athens, Texas micropolitan area, United States
The Athens, Tennessee micropolitan area, United States

See also
Athens metropolitan area (disambiguation)
Athens (disambiguation)